Horr was a book by the Iranian author Ali Shariati about the historic Battle of Karbala in which Hussein, the grandson of the Muslim prophet Muhammad, was killed by Yazid. Horr was a commander of the army of Yazid during the battle. First involved in fighting Hussein, Horr defected from the army of Yazid, joined Hussein, and was killed by Yazid's forces. The book examines fate, choice, and predestination as portrayed by Horr's decision to switch sides during the fateful battle.

See also

 Ahrar (disambiguation)

References

External links 
Summary of the book

History books about Iran
Works by Ali Shariati